Didier Vanoverschelde (born 5 April 1952) is a former French racing cyclist. He rode in five editions of the Tour de France between 1979 and 1983.

References

External links

1952 births
Living people
Sportspeople from Nord (French department)
French male cyclists
French people of Flemish descent
Cyclists from Hauts-de-France